Tokuzō is a masculine Japanese given name.

Possible writings
Tokuzō can be written using different combinations of kanji characters. Some examples:

徳三, "benevolence, three"
徳蔵, "benevolence, store up"
徳造, "benevolence, create"
得三, "gain, three"
得蔵, "gain, store up"
得造, "gain, create"
篤三, "sincere, three"
竺三, "bamboo, three"
啄三, "peck, three"
登久三, "climb up, long time, three"

The name can also be written in hiragana とくぞう or katakana トクゾウ.

Notable people with the name
, Japanese chef
, Japanese economist
, Japanese film director

Japanese masculine given names